Before Me is a studio album by American singer Gladys Knight. It was released by Verve Records on October 10, 2006 in the United States.

Track listing

Charts

Release history

References 

Gladys Knight albums
2006 albums
albums produced by Tommy LiPuma
albums produced by Phil Ramone
Verve Records albums
Covers albums